Vladivostok Urban Okrug is an urban okrug in Primorsky Krai, Russia. It includes the administrative territorial entities of Vladivostok, Popova, Trudovoye, Primorsky Krai. The administrative center is Vladivostok.

References

Urban okrugs of Russia